Petr Pavlas (born 4 February 1968) is a Czech former professional ice hockey player who played with HC Slovan Bratislava in the Slovak Extraliga.

Pavlas also previously played for HC Olomouc, HC Zlín, HC Pardubice, Tappara Tampere, Kokkolan Hermes, HC Oceláři Třinec, HC Karlovy Vary and HC Havířov.

He ended his active career in November 2008.

Career statistics

References

1968 births
Living people
Czech ice hockey defencemen
HK Dukla Trenčín players
HC Dynamo Pardubice players
HC Havířov players
HC Karlovy Vary players
EHC Kloten players
Kokkolan Hermes players
KOOVEE players
HC Oceláři Třinec players
HC Olomouc players
Sportspeople from Olomouc
HC ZUBR Přerov players
HC Slovan Bratislava players
Stadion Hradec Králové players
Tappara players
Washington Capitals draft picks
PSG Berani Zlín players
Czechoslovak ice hockey defencemen
Czech expatriate ice hockey players in Finland
Czech expatriate ice hockey players in Switzerland